Troy Honeysett is an Australian actor. He is also known for his time with Australian Dance Theatre and his "ferocious athleticism" on stage. Honeysett is a graduate from the National Institute of Dramatic Art, Sydney, Australia, and Te Whaea, Wellington, New Zealand. He is the face of Builders Academy Australia.

Background
Honeysett made his American feature film debut in Universal Pictures' Hard Target 2 (released Sept 2016). His most recent performance is in Australian cinema release The Combination: Redemption (premiered Feb 2019). He has been credited in productions by Australian companies Pinchgut Opera, Theatre of Image, Bell Shakespeare, Opera Australia; and various other screen roles.

Honeysett was born in Alice Springs, Northern Territory and began classical ballet later in life, having proven himself a proficient gymnast and international martial arts competitor. He became a Principal dancer with Australian Dance Theatre (ADT), and during this time toured full-length contemporary dance works throughout Europe, The United States and Japan. Honeysett left ADT to attend the National Institute of Dramatic Art (NIDA) to pursue acting.

Honeysett plays action-hero "Bob the Builder" in an advertising campaign from Builders Academy Australia – the first television release was banned from free-to-air broadcast for "glamourising unsafe workplace behaviour".

Other screen appearances include ABC Television's Artscape documentary series – Artists at Work and The Making of Collision Course. He appeared in Seasons Two and Three of reality-television series So You Think You Can Dance Australia, with Guest Performances and Choreography by Australian Dance Theatre. Honeysett was first seen on screen in The Man from Snowy River: Arena Spectacular (film).

Honeysett is a stage and screen movement director, stunt advisor, coach, educator, and dramaturg.

Filmography

Films

Television

Theatre

Dance

See also

References

External links

 
 
 Troy Honeysett at AusStage
 

Living people
Year of birth missing (living people)
Australian male dancers
Australian male karateka
Australian male film actors
Australian male television actors
Australian male voice actors
Australian male stage actors
21st-century Australian male actors
National Institute of Dramatic Art alumni
People from Alice Springs